Vassøy is an island in Stavanger municipality in Rogaland county, Norway. The islands of Roaldsøy, Bjørnøy, and Langøy lie to the west and the island of Lindøy lies to the southeast. Vassøy had 702 inhabitants (in 2016) who all live along the western shore of the island; the eastern side is more rugged and wooded. The island has a primary school with around 80 pupils.

The only access to the island is by private boats or the regular ferry route administered by Kolumbus that goes from Vassøy to the city centre.  A bridge connecting Vassøy to either Bjørnøy or Roaldsøy has been approved, but a starting date for construction has not been set.

See also
List of islands of Norway

References

Islands of Stavanger